Natan Yakovlevich Eidelman (1930 in Moscow – 1989 in Moscow) was a Soviet Russian author and historian. He wrote several books on about the life and work of Alexander Pushkin, Decembrists Sergey Muravyov-Apostol and Mikhail Lunin, and historian Nikolai Mikhailovich Karamzin.

Bibliography
Conspiracy Against the Tsar. A Portrait of the Decembrists. Progress Moscow (1985); 294 pages.
Apostol Sergei : povest' o Sergee Murav'eve-Apostole. Eidel'man, Natan Iakovlevich. Vagrius Moscow (2005); 349 pages.
Lunin.  Eidel'man, Natan Iakovlevich. Vagrius Moscow (2004); 413 pages; .
Pervyi dekabrist : povest' o neobyknovennoi zhizni i posmertnoi sud'be Vladimira Raevskogo.  Eidel'man, Natan Iakovlevich. Vagrius Moskva (2005); 397 pages.
Poslednii letopisets. Eidel'man, Natan Iakovlevich. Vagrius Moskva (2004); 247 pages.

Books in Russian

"Прекрасен наш союз ..."
"Революция сверху" в России
Александр Радищев
Апостол Сергей
Большой Жанно
Братья Бестужевы
Быть может за хребтом Кавказа
Вьеварум; Лунин
Грань веков
Декабристы
Заговор против царя
Из потаенной истории России XVIII-XIX веков
Мгновенье славы настает...
Обреченный отряд
Оттуда
Первый декабрист
Последний летописец
Пушкин
Пущин: Большой Жанно: Повесть об Иване Пущине
Русский 1789-й
Свободное слово Герцена
Твой 18-й век; Прекрасен наш союз....
Твой восемнадцатый век
Твой девятнадцатый век
Что там за морем - океаном

See also
https://web.archive.org/web/20051120025451/http://vivovoco.rsl.ru/VV/PAPERS/NYE/EIDELMAN.HTM

1930 births
1989 deaths
Writers from Moscow
Russian Jews
Russian philologists
Jewish Russian writers
Soviet historians
Soviet Jews
Soviet male writers
Soviet philologists
20th-century philologists
Academic staff of High Courses for Scriptwriters and Film Directors
20th-century non-fiction writers
Male non-fiction writers